Heojun Museum is a municipal museum in Gayang 2-dong, Gangseo-gu, Seoul, South Korea to commemorate the legacy of Heo Jun (1546–1615), a court physician during the reign of King Seonjo (r. 1567 – 1608) of the mid Joseon Dynasty of Korea.

See also
List of museums in Seoul
List of museums in South Korea

External links
Official site

Gangseo District, Seoul
Museums in Seoul
History museums in South Korea
Museums established in 2005